This is a list of the transfers for the 2013–14 A-League season. This list includes transfers featuring at least one A-League club. Promotions from youth squads to the first squad of the same club are not included.

Transfers

All players without a flag are Australian. Clubs without a flag are clubs participating in the A-League.

Pre-season

Mid-season

References

External links
A-League official website

A-League Men transfers
transfers
Football transfers summer 2013
Football transfers winter 2013–14